Wayne Elcock (born 12 February 1974) is a British former professional boxer who competed from 1999 to 2009. He challenged once for the IBF middleweight title in 2007. At regional level, he held the British middleweight title from 2007 to 2009.

Career
Elcock was managed by Frank Maloney at the start of his career and promoted by Panix promotions before moving after 2 winning fights to Frank Warren, then later to Mick Hennessy. Elcock was trained in Leicester to begin with by Jez brogan, before moving to London to be trained by both Frank Maloney and Alan Smith, along with several visits to america to build on his skills, where Wayne worked with Goody Petronelli the trainer of former world champions Marvelous Marvin Hagler and Steve Collins at his famous Brockton gym. Wayne came back to his home town to team up with Birmingham's most successful boxing trainers brothers Paddy & Tommy Lynch. Knocking out fellow contender Darren Rhodes in 1 minute 30 seconds in Elcocks homecoming and first ever fight with the Lynch brothers in Birmingham at a sold out Aston Events Centre, this setting up his first attempt at the prestigious British title Lonsdale Belt against Plymouth's Scott Dann (boxer) in the first British title fight to ever be scored by three judges, after defeat Wayne bounced back with two back to back knockout victories one of them a British title eliminator winning by TKO against Scotland's Lawrence Murphy, who was the only other boxer to have beaten Elcock, In Wayne's next contest he faced the English champion Steven Bendall who was to be yet another stopped, but this time over eight punishing rounds and setting up his next contest where he would become the first British boxer to beat long standing British and Commonwealth champion Howard Eastman to win the coveted Lonsdale Belt in 2007, Elcock also won the Commonwealth title and the minor WBU World Middleweight title becoming the first Birmingham born fighter to ever hold a version of a World title. Elcock challenged for the IBF middleweight title against the unbeaten World champion Arthur Abraham on 8 December 2007, losing by a fifth round knockout. Wayne bounced back from his world title attempt defending the lonsdale belt with a TKO win against local Dudley rival Darren McDermott, before losing the next defence to fellow Birmingham fighter Matthew Macklin in the Battle of Brum Elcock retired after this contest at the age of 36 with a record of 23 -19 - 9 KO’s to concentrate fully on his other businesses, today Wayne can be found mentoring in schools and behind the counter at Mad Dog's Boxing shop located in Sutton Coldfield, Birmingham, as well as coaching in the evening at the multi award winning company Wayne Elcock's Box Clever and training professional fighters at his Kronk Birmingham gym in Chelmsley Wood, which is not far from where he grew up in Shard End.

Professional boxing record

See also
 List of British middleweight boxing champions

References

External links

 
 Official website
 www.maddogsboxing.com
 www.wayneelcocksboxcleverltd.com

1974 births
Living people
English male boxers
Middleweight boxers
Boxers from Birmingham, West Midlands
Black British sportsmen